Farm to Market Road 961 (FM 961) is a state highway in the U.S. state of Texas that remains within Wharton County. The two-lane road starts at State Highway 71 (SH 71) in New Taiton, heads east through farmlands and oil fields and ends at Future Business Interstate 69/U.S. Business Route 59 southwest of Wharton.

Route description
FM 961 begins at a stop sign on SH 71 in front of the Taiton Community Center at New Taiton and heads directly east. County Road 370 goes straight west from the same intersection. Near Saint John Nepomucene Catholic Church, the highway turns to the northeast before going east. Near New Taiton, the highway pursues a winding route through an area with several oil wells. After going a short distance east, FM 961 again veers northeast before turning back to the east. The highway heads northeast before coming to a sharp curve to the southeast. After passing Boys Pond Road, the highway turns into a generally easterly course. At a distance  from New Taiton, FM 961 intersects with FM 960 at right angles. The Wharton County Youth Fair Grounds are situated on the northeast corner of the crossroads which are controlled by a four-way stop sign. 

From the fair grounds until its end, FM 961 goes in a straight line to the southeast past several more oil wells. After continuing  from the FM 960 junction, the highway comes to the Future I-69/US 59 underpass. FM 961 can be accessed via an exit ramp for southbound Future I-69/US 59 traffic. There is an entrance ramp from FM 961 to northbound Future I-69/US 59. To access southbound Future I-69/US 59, a traveler must continue southeast  to Future Business I-69/Business US 59 and turn right. A left turn will take one northeast on Future Business I-69/Business US 59 into Wharton.

History
On June 30, 1976, the eastern end of FM 961 was redesignated as State Loop 183. On November 20, 1998, State Loop 183 was discontinued and its right-of-way was transferred to Business I-69/Business US 59.

Major intersections

See also

References

0961
Transportation in Wharton County, Texas